Wang Chunghui (d. 1182/3) or Wang Hyeonhui was a Goryeo Royal Prince as the fourth son of King Injong and Queen Gongye. He was also a Buddhist monk under the name Wongyeongguksa and Jeungseseungtong.

Biography

Early life and relatives
Although the exact date when Chunghui was born is unknown, seeing that his brothers were born in 1131 (Wang Ho) and 1144 (Wang Tak), Chunghui was born after 1131 but before 1144 as the fourth son of King Injong of Goryeo and Queen Gongye from the Jangheung Im clan. He had four brothers (Uijong, Daeryeong, Myeongjong, Sinjong)  and four sisters (Seunggyeong, Deoknyeong, Changrak, Yeonghwa).

During Uijong's reign
In 1148 (Uijong's 2nd year reign), Chunghui went to Heungwang Temple (흥왕사) as a monk and received the name Jeungseseungtong (증세승통, 拯世僧統) from his eldest brother–the king. In there, Chunghui befriended and often played together with his great-grandfather's grandson, Wang Jang (왕장). However, there was a rumor spread that the two of them were planning a treason in 1155 and Uijong then revoked Wang Jang's title, but didn't punish Chunghui by considering that Chunghuo was once his full younger brother.

In 1157, Chunghui was one of the 200 monks who joined Uijong in performed the "Gibokjae" (기복재, 祈福齋) at Mokchin Hall (목친전). Then, in 1167, a banquet was held at Cheongnyeongjae (청녕재, 淸寧齋), many people (include Chunghui) were invited and enjoyed this, even monk Gakye (각예)–Yejong's eldest illegitimate son and some servants attended this banquet and drank, floated a boat in Jungmijeong Pound (중미정, 衆美亭) and played till night.

During Myeongjong's reign
In 1177 (Myeongjong's 7th year reign), a monk from Heungwang Temple reported that: "Monk Chunghui was secretly plotting to rebel with several monks there" (승통 충희가 여러 승려들과 몰래 음모를 꾀하고 있다). Following this, Chunghui's servants were interrogated, but all charges were not found and they were all released then.

Meanwhile, in 1180, Chunghui's mother, the queen dowager became seriously ill and his older brother–the king summoned him to take care of their mother. In the palace, Chunghui had a promiscuous relationship (even affair) with the court ladies and even with the princess. As the bad rumors about Chunghui spread to the outside of the palace, officer Choe Seon (최선) reported Chunghui's promiscuous behavior to the king and suggested that Chunghui sent out of the palace.

However, Myeongjong who heard this, greatly surprised and said: "Woah, unexpectedly you(refer to Choe) is trying to separate our brotherhood relationship" (뜻밖에 사간이 우리 형제를 이간질 하는구나) while dismissed Choe not long after this from his position. Seeing this issue, the officers didn't dare to do anything or even impeach Chunghui and the court ministers were all attached to Chunghui and offered bribes for him.

Death and later life
In 1182/3, Chunghui died and received the name Wongyeongguksa  (원경국사, 元敬國師) as his honorary Posthumous name. Upon knowing this, Myeongjong deliberately didn't disclose this fact since he feared that their mother would be grieved and her ill would get worse if she couldn't withstand this. After several months, she slowly learned that her beloved son died and thought that many jealous generals had killed Chunghui. She also became very angry and eventually fell ill before she died not long after that.

Legacy
To commemorate Chunghui, a monument (충희선사탑비) was erected at Heunggyo Temple (흥교사), but didn't maintained in the nowadays and no records left about that.

References

충희 on Goryeosa .

Korean princes
1183 deaths
Year of birth unknown
Goryeo Buddhist monks
12th-century Buddhist monks